The Battle of Błonie was a battle fought on 10 July 1794, during the Kościuszko Uprising, near the town of Błonie, near Warsaw. It was fought between the Kościuszko insurrectionists led by Stanisław Mokronowski, and the Prussian Army of the Kingdom of Prussia. The battle ended with insurrectionists' victory, who managed to block the Prussian Army from marching towards the city of Warsaw.

References 

Blonie
Blonie
Blonie
Blonie
History of Masovia